The Bahrain national women's cricket team is the team that represents Bahrain in international women's cricket. In April 2018, the International Cricket Council (ICC) granted full Women's Twenty20 International (WT20I) status to all its members. Therefore, all Twenty20 matches played between Bahrain women and other ICC members after 1 July 2018 will be a full WT20I.

Records and Statistics

International Match Summary — Bahrain Women
 
Last updated 22 June 2022

Twenty20 International

T20I record versus other nations

Records complete to WT20I #1143. Last updated 22 June 2022.

See also
 Bahrain national cricket team
 List of Bahrain women Twenty20 International cricketers

References

Women's
Women's national cricket teams
Cricket